Vilar de Mouros Bridge crosses the Coura river in Vilar de Mouros, Portugal. It was classified as a National Monument in 1910.

See also
List of bridges in Portugal

References

Bridges in Viana do Castelo District
Buildings and structures in Caminha
National monuments in Viana do Castelo District
Listed bridges in Portugal